In Advance of the Broken Arm is the debut album by Marnie Stern, released in 2007. Kill Rock Stars handled the CD release, and the vinyl with a shorter track listing came out on Rampage Records. The title comes from a work of art of the same title by artist Marcel Duchamp.

Track listing

CD
 "Vibrational Match" - 3:37
 "Grapefruit" - 2:47
 "Every Single Line Means Something" - 3:40
 "Precious Metal" - 3:10
 "Put All Your Eggs in One Basket and Then Watch That Basket!!!" - 2:41
 "Logical Volume" - 3:40
 "Absorb Those Numbers" - 3:21
 "This American Life" - 4:05
 "Letters from Rimbaud" - 3:39
 "The Weight of a Rock" - 2:30
 "Plato's Fucked Up Cave" - 3:30
 "Healer" - 3:29
 "Patterns of a Diamond Ceiling" - 4:24

LP

Side A
 "Vibrational Match" - 3:37
 "Grapefruit" - 2:47
 "Every Single Line Means Something" - 3:40
 "Precious Metal" - 3:10
 "Put All Your Eggs in One Basket and Then Watch That Basket!!!" - 2:41

Side B
 "Absorb Those Numbers" - 3:21
 "This American Life" - 4:05
 "Healer" - 3:29
 "Patterns of a Diamond Ceiling" - 4:24

Personnel

Performers 
 Marnie Stern: vocals, guitar, keyboards
 John-Reed Thompson: bass, keyboards, organ
 Zach Hill: drums, bass, keyboards, piano

Other 
 Songs written by Marnie Stern, except for "Vibrational Match", which was written by Marnie Stern and Bella Foster
 Arrangements by Marnie Stern and Zach Hill
 Engineering and mixing by John-Reed Thompson at Retrofit Recording, Sacramento, California, with additional engineering by Marnie Stern
 Produced by Zach Hill
 Mastered by John Golden
 Artwork by Bella Foster

References

Marnie Stern albums
2007 debut albums
Kill Rock Stars albums